The men's team was an artistic gymnastics event held as part of the gymnastics at the 1920 Summer Olympics programme. It was the fourth appearance of the event, which was one of three team gymnastics events held in 1920 (along with the free system team event and the Swedish system team event). The competition was held on Monday, 23 August 1920 and on Tuesday, 24 August 1920. Five teams competed, for a total of 120 gymnasts.

Medalists

Results

The competition was composed of five parts; exercises with instruments, horizontal bar, parallel bars, pommel horse, and hurdle exercise (four hurdles of 70 cm.). On the horizontal bar, parallel bars, and pommel horse, a compulsory and an optional exercise were performed. Maximum score was 404 points.

References

Sources
 
 

Gymnastics at the 1920 Summer Olympics